Kin Sang is one of the 31 constituencies in the Tuen Mun District.

Created for the 1994 District Board elections, the constituency returns one district councillor to the Tuen Mun District Council, with an election every four years.

Kin Sang loosely covers areas surrounding Blossom Garden, Goodrich Garden, Kin Sang Estate, Siu Hin Court and Venice Gardens in Tuen Mun with an estimated population of 16,698.

Councillors represented

Election results

2010s

References

Tuen Mun
Constituencies of Hong Kong
Constituencies of Tuen Mun District Council
1994 establishments in Hong Kong
Constituencies established in 1994